Hamilton John Agmondesham Cuffe, 5th Earl of Desart,  (30 August 1848 – 4 November 1934) was an Irish peer and barrister.

Early life
Cuffe was the second son of John Cuffe, 3rd Earl of Desart and his wife, Lady Elizabeth Campbell.  He had an older sister, Lady Alice Mary Cuffe, and brother, William Cuffe, and a younger brother, Captain Otway Cuffe.  His older sister married John Henniker-Major, 5th Baron Henniker and was the mother of twelve children.

His paternal grandparents were John Cuffe, 2nd Earl of Desart, and Catherine, daughter of Maurice O'Connor. His mother was the third daughter of John Campbell, 1st Earl Cawdor (a son of John Campbell, 1st Baron Cawdor) and Lady Elizabeth Thynne, daughter of Thomas Thynne, 2nd Marquess of Bath.

Career
In his early life, he was a midshipman in the Royal Navy, before becoming a barrister in 1872.  In 1877, he was appointed as a secretary to the Judicature Committee and as a solicitor to The Treasury a year later.  In 1894, he was appointed a Companion of the Order of the Bath and as Treasury Solicitor that year, as well as Queen's Proctor and Director of Public Prosecutions.

From 1917 to 1918, he participated as an Unionist delegate to the Irish Convention.

In 1920, he was also appointed Lord Lieutenant of Kilkenny, a post he held until the Irish Free State was formed in 1922, when all lord lieutenancies of Ireland (bar those of Northern Ireland) were abolished.

Peerage
In 1898, he inherited the earldom of Desart from his elder brother, William (who died without heirs male) and was promoted as a Knight commander of the order of the Bath.

In 1909, Desart was created Baron Desart in the Peerage of the United Kingdom, which enabled him to sit in the House of Lords (his other titles being in the Peerage of Ireland, which did not entitle him to a seat).  In 1913, he was sworn of the Privy Council and appointed a Knight of the Order of St Patrick in 1919.

Personal life
On 19 July 1876, Lord Desart had married his second cousin, Lady Margaret Joan Lascelles (1853–1927), the second daughter of Henry Lascelles, 4th Earl of Harewood by his first wife, Lady Elizabeth Joanna de Burgh, daughter of Ulick de Burgh, 1st Marquess of Clanricarde. They had two daughters:

 Lady Joan Elizabeth Mary Cuffe (1877–1951), who married Sir Harry Lloyd-Verney. They had issue; three sons and one daughter, Joan Verena Verney (who died aged 30), mother of the 10th Viscount Boyne (1931–1995).
 Lady Sybil Marjorie Cuffe (1879–1943), who married (1) 30 April 1901 William Bayard Cutting Jr. (1878-1910), son of William Bayard Cutting and then secretary to the US embassy to the Court of St. James's, by whom she had one daughter Iris Origo (1902–1988); (2) 23 April 1918 (div 1926) Geoffrey Scott (1884–1929), Bernard Berenson's secretary and an architectural historian, by whom she had no issue; (3) 8 December 1926 Percy Lubbock (1879–1965), nephew of John Lubbock, 1st Baron Avebury. Lady Sybil Lubbock died 31 December 1943, and was survived by her third husband, her daughter Iris Origo and two surviving granddaughters.

As Desart was the last male descendant of the 1st Earl and died without male heirs in 1934, his titles became extinct.

References

External links
 Hamilton John Agmondesham Cuffe, 5th Earl of Desart at the National Portrait Gallery, London.
 

1848 births
1934 deaths
Knights Commander of the Order of the Bath
Knights of St Patrick
Lawyers awarded knighthoods
Lord-Lieutenants of Kilkenny
Members of the Privy Council of the United Kingdom
Members of the Senate of Southern Ireland
Directors of Public Prosecutions (England and Wales)
Royal Navy officers
Irish barristers
Earls of Desart
Peers created by Edward VII